Forbidden Dream is a 2019 South Korean historical drama film directed by Hur Jin-ho and written by Jung Bum-shik and Lee Ji-min. Based on a true story, it portrays Sejong the Great (Han Suk-kyu), king of the Joseon dynasty of Korea, and his relationship with his greatest scientist, Jang Yeong-sil (Choi Min-sik). It made its international debut at the 2020 New York Asian Film Festival in August 2020.

Synopsis
King Sejong (Han Suk-kyu), the greatest ruler in Chosun history seeks to enhance national prosperity and military power through astronomy with the help of his greatest scientist, Jang Yeong-sil (Choi Min-sik). For twenty years they forged a relationship but due to an incident, Jang Yeong-sil was removed from his post and disappeared completely.

Cast
 Choi Min-sik as Jang Yeong-sil
 Han Suk-kyu as Sejong
 Shin Goo as Hwang Hui
 Kim Hong-fa as Yi Cheon
 Huh Joon-ho as Cho Mal-saeng
 Kim Tae-woo as Jeong Nam-son
 Kim Won-hae as Cho Soon-saeng
 Im Won-hee as Lim Hyo-don
 Yoon Je-moon as Choi Hyo-nam
 Jeon Yeo-been as Sa-im
 Oh Hee-joon as Young eunuch

See also
The King's Letters

References

External links

 

2019 films
2019 drama films
2010s historical drama films
2010s Korean-language films
Drama films based on actual events
Films about astronomy
Films about scientists
Films directed by Hur Jin-ho
Films set in the Joseon dynasty
Lotte Entertainment films
South Korean films based on actual events
South Korean historical drama films
2010s South Korean films